Thomas Walpole (6 October 1727 – March 1803), styled from 1756 The Hon. Thomas Walpole, was a British MP and banker in Paris.

Life
Thomas Walpole was born into a political family. The second son of the 1st Baron Walpole and his wife Telisha, nee Lombard, he was the nephew of Sir Robert Walpole, the prime minister from 1721 to 1742.

Walpole entered into partnership with the merchant Sir Joshua Vanneck, and married his daughter Elizabeth Vanneck on 14 November 1753. She died on 9 June 1760.

He was MP for Sudbury from 1754 to 1761, and MP for Ashburton from 1761 to 1768. In 1762 he was involved in efforts to engineer William Pitt the Elder into a rapprochement with the Duke of Newcastle. In 1768 he succeeded his cousin Horace Walpole as MP for Lynn, sitting until 1784, when he was succeeded by his nephew Horatio Walpole.

From 1753 to 1754 he served as a Director of the East India Company. In the early 1770s Walpole led a group of investors, including Benjamin Franklin, to seek from the crown a land grant in Ohio.

In 1787 he married his second wife, Jeanne-Marguerite Batailhe de Montval. From 1799 until his death Walpole lived in a large house, today named Walpole House, on Chiswick Mall, Chiswick.

His son Thomas (1755–1840) was British Ambassador to Munich.

References

External links

1727 births
1803 deaths
British bankers
Directors of the British East India Company
Members of the Parliament of Great Britain for Ashburton
British MPs 1754–1761
British MPs 1761–1768
British MPs 1768–1774
British MPs 1774–1780
British MPs 1780–1784
Thomas
Younger sons of barons